Total mycosynthesis is the combination of the use of a filamentous fungal host organism with a genetic expression system that allows the assembly and controlled expression of one or more biosynthetic genes. Total mycosynthesis involves the reconstruction and/or engineering of biosynthetic pathways for the production of secondary metabolites. It is competitive with chemical total synthesis. It can be used both for the production of known natural products, and for the engineering of pathways to produce new compounds or pathway intermediates.Examples include the total mycosynthesis of tenellin where the tenS, tenC, tenA and tenB genes were transferred from Beauveria bassiana to the expression host Aspergillus oryzae. The expression system allows the engineering of TenS  to control chain-length and methylation pattern.

Examples

References

Mycology